Nicolás Tedeschi (born 28 November 1996) is an Argentine professional footballer who plays as a goalkeeper for Defensores Unidos.

Career
Tedeschi played for the youth system of Independiente, signing in 2014. He subsequently moved to Defensores Unidos of Primera B Metropolitana. In mid-2017, Tedeschi joined Torneo Federal B side Sportivo Baradero on loan. No appearances followed. Tedeschi returned to his parent club and signed a new two-year contract in June 2018. He made his professional bow on 18 May 2019 during a final day encounter with Flandria, appearing for every minute of a 3–1 defeat.

Career statistics
.

References

External links

1996 births
Living people
People from Baradero
Argentine footballers
Association football goalkeepers
Primera B Metropolitana players
Defensores Unidos footballers
Sportspeople from Buenos Aires Province